Interleukin 20 receptor, beta subunit (IL20R2 or IL20RB) is a subunit of the interleukin-20 receptor and interleukin-22 receptor. It is believed to be involved in both pro-inflammatory and anti-inflammatory responses.

IL20RB is found in many organ resident effector cells such as keratinocytes at the skin epidermis, osteoclasts, found in bones, and epithelial cells of the intestine and trachea. IL20RB is also found in some immune cells. The subunit has been linked with multiple diseases, including gastrointestinal diseases and glaucoma.

Structure and function 
IL20RB is a β-chain with a short intracellular domain. IL20RB, along with the IL-20 receptor, alpha subunit, form the heterodimeric type I interleukin-20 receptor, which binds the cytokines IL-20 and IL-24. IL20RB also associates with IL-22 receptor, to form the heterodimeric type II interleukin-20 receptor, which also binds IL-20 and IL-24.

Signaling 
After a cytokine binds both the IL20RB and the alpha subunit of the IL20 receptor, a signal is sent through the JAK-STAT signaling pathway. This signaling pathway leads STAT to act as a transcription factor, which can gene expression.

Link to Immune System and Disease 
IL20RB mRNA is present in some immune cells, including monocytes, natural killer cells, B-cells, T-cells, and some hematopoietic stem cells. It is known what role IL20RB plays in these cells.

IL20RB is linked with atherosclerosis and gastrointestinal diseases, although its specific roles are unkown.

Glaucoma 
IL20RB mRNA is expressed in retinal ganglion cells and optic nerves in rats. Mutations in the IL20RB gene are associated with glaucoma. The specific links between IL20RB and glaucoma are unkown, but IL20RB does not have a causative effect on the disease, instead contributing to an increased risk of the disease along with other factors, such as intraocular pressure.

References

Further reading

External links